Mewalal Chaudhary (alias Mewa lal Kushwaha; 4 January 1953 – 19 April 2021) was a leader of Janata Dal (United) and a minister for a brief period of time in the Nitish Kumar cabinet. He was elected from the Tarapur assembly to the Bihar Legislative Assembly in 2020. He was a minister in charge of Education in the 2020 Bihar Government but had to resign just three days after his appointment amidst row over his alleged involvement in a corruption case for which he was booked earlier.

Biography
Born on 4 January 1953 to Deep Narayan Chaudhary in Munger district, Mewalal was Master of Science in Agriculture. Chaudhary belongs to Kushwaha community. He was married to Neetu Chaudhary, who was a JD(U) MLA. Neetu however died in an accident caused by gas cylinder blast at her residence. He entered active politics in 2010 and remained successful in getting elected to Bihar Legislative Assembly in the year 2015 on the ticket of Janata Dal (United). He defeated Shakuni Choudhury of Hindustani Awam Morcha in that election.

He has served as Vice Chancellor of Rajendra Agricultural University, Pusa, Samastipur and Bihar Agricultural University, Sabaur. Chaudhary has also remained one of the members of Committee which drafted Bihar Agricultural roadmap. Serving as the horticultural commissioner of the Government of India he assisted in development of the draft horticulture mission, micro irrigation project as well as National Bamboo Mission. He has also worked for the upliftment of downtrodden.

Chaudhary was allegedly involved in mismanagement of appointments to Bihar Agricultural University on the post of junior scientists and Professors while he was the head of it in 2017. Consequently, he was sacked by the ruling JD (U) in the meantime which was ruling in alliance with the Rashtriya Janata Dal and JD (U) former alliance Bharatiya Janata Party was in opposition. In the same year he was granted anticipatory bail in the said case and was taken back in the party in 2018.

Mewalal once again won from the Tarapur seat and was appointed education minister in the Nitish Kumar cabinet in 2020. The appointment was questioned by the opposition while serious allegations were made regarding the death of his wife by an Indian Police Service officer who linked it to political conspiracy pertaining to the Bihar Agricultural University 2017 scam. On 19 November 2020, just three days after assuming the office of Education minister Mewalal resigned amidst protest by the opposition regarding giving the ministerial berth to an accused of corruption. He was allegedly involved in fraudulent appointment to the post of agricultural Scientist and junior Professor during his tenure as Vice Chancellor of Bihar Agricultural University.

Death
Chaudhary died on 19 April 2021 due to COVID-19 at Paras hospital in Patna, Bihar.

References

1953 births
2021 deaths
People from Munger district
Janata Dal (United) politicians
Government ministers of India
Bihar MLAs 2020–2025
Deaths from the COVID-19 pandemic in India